Biscoe is a surname. Notable people with the surname include:
Bert Biscoe, Cornish bard
Charles Biscoe (1875-1948), British fencer
Chris Biscoe (1947 - ), English jazz multi-instrumentalist
Donna Biscoe (born 1955), American actress
John Biscoe (1794 - 1843), nineteenth-century English explorer
John Biscoe (MP) (1613-1672), English politician and colonel in the New Model Army
Maurice B. Biscoe ( - 1953), American architect
Patsy Biscoe (1946 - ), Australian singer
Richard Biscoe (  - 1748), English clergyman and dissenting minister

See also
Alec Julian Tyndale-Biscoe (1906-1997), Rear Admiral and naval engineer
Cecil Tyndale-Biscoe (1863–1949), British missionary and educationist